Florian W. Chmielewski Sr. (born February 10, 1927) is a Minnesota musician, politician, a former legislator, and a former President of the Minnesota Senate.

Chmielewski was elected to the Senate in 1970, becoming chair of the employment committee in 1981. During a special session in 1987, Chmielewski was elected to serve as president, due to the absence of State Sen. Jerome M. Hughes, who both preceded and succeeded Chmielewski in the position.

In 1996, Chmielewski became embroiled in the "phonegate" scandal. It was revealed that Chmielewski had given family members state long-distance access codes, allowing them to make phone calls at state expense. Chmielewski was ultimately defeated for re-election in 1996, after pleading guilty to a misdemeanor.

Chmielewski continues to work as an accordion player with the Chmielewski Family Funtime Band, performing polka music throughout the midwest.

References

Presidents of the Minnesota Senate
Democratic Party Minnesota state senators
Musicians from Minnesota
1927 births
Living people
People from Pine County, Minnesota
University of Minnesota alumni